Ben Lester (born 16 April 1998) is a British recording artist and multi-instrumentalist, based in North London. His style has been described as "a distinctive brand of chamber-pop" informed by the likes of The Beach Boys and The Flaming Lips.

Lester was chosen as a BBC Introducing featured artist at age 19, and was championed by presenter Gary Crowley as a "hugely talented singer-songwriter" who "creates his own unique moods". Following regular airplay of his debut single "Dreaming", Lester signed to Mayfield Records, and subsequently embarked on a UK tour in support of his upcoming debut album. The album, One, was released in January 2020 to critical acclaim.

Personal life 
He was born in Barnet and raised in Watford, where he attended Watford Grammar School for Boys. He studied at The University of Southampton, graduating in 2019 with a BA Music. He is the son of music journalist Paul Lester.

Discography

LPs 
One (2020)

EPs 
Soar (2023)

References

1998 births
Living people
British male singer-songwriters
British multi-instrumentalists
21st-century British singers
21st-century British male singers